Longridge Towers School is a non-selective co-educational independent day and boarding school in the parish of Horncliffe (formerly Longridge) near Berwick-upon-Tweed, Northumberland, England, for children between the ages of three and eighteen. It is the only independent school near the town and the only independent school in the county which educates children from reception to sixth form.

School history
The main house was built during the 1870s and was once a hotel and military barracks. In 1949 it became an Ursuline convent school and remained so until 1983 when the order left Northumberland. It was then sold to a charitable trust and named Longridge Towers School. It now has some two hundred and fifty pupils. Most children are day pupils, with a minority of boarding pupils, including international students.

In April 2021, a teacher at the school, Richard Glenn, was sacked from his role as head of sixth form and banned from teaching throughout the country after becoming drunk, threatening and taking pupils to a strip club during a school trip to San José, Costa Rica in July 2019.

Building history

The Longridge estate was acquired, through his marriage, by Hubert Jerningham, who from 1881 to 1885 had been a Liberal Member of Parliament for Berwick-upon-Tweed. He was thereafter colonial secretary of the British Honduras (Belize) (1887–1889), colonial secretary (1889–1893) and lieutenant-governor of Mauritius (1892–1893), and governor of Trinidad and Tobago (1897–1900). The principal building, erected as his stately home, at great cost, incorporated the very latest innovations including a hydraulic lift and gas lighting to all parts of the main house. The portico is said to have been built for a visit of the Prince of Wales to make sure he did not get wet when alighting from his coach. When it was completed it was one of the largest private houses in the north of Northumberland, and Jerningham lived there until his death in 1914. Lady Jerningham (d. 1902) had been Annie, daughter of E. Liddell, of Benton Park, and widow of C. T. Mather of Longridge, and her statue sits on the Elizabethan town walls in Berwick-upon-Tweed looking towards the distant school. The building was afterwards a hotel, until it became a convent school.

Inspections

Boarding provision at the school was inspected by Ofsted in 2009. At that date there were 24 pupils in the boarding accommodation. The provision received a judgement of 'satisfactory'.

The school was inspected by the Independent Schools Inspectorate in 2017. At that time there were 288 day pupils and 30 boarding pupils. Academic and other achievements were judged 'good', and pupils' personal development was judged 'excellent'.

References

Kelly's Handbook to the Titled, Landed and Official Classes 1903, p. 823.

External links
School website
Profile on the ISC website

Private schools in Northumberland
Boarding schools in Northumberland
Educational institutions established in 1983
1983 establishments in England